Bera  is a town and municipality located in the province and autonomous community of Navarre, northern Spain. The river Bidasoa crosses the town before entering Gipuzkoa at Endarlatsa, and joining the Cantabrian Sea (Bay of Biscay) between the towns of Hendaye and Hondarribia.

References

External links

 BERA/VERA DE BIDASOA in the Bernardo Estornés Lasa - Auñamendi Encyclopedia (Euskomedia Fundazioa) 

Municipalities in Navarre